Smith Observatory was an observatory at Beloit College in Beloit, Wisconsin. Completed in 1882, the observatory was funded by Janette S. Herrick and named in memory of her brother, John F. Smith. It served the campus from 1882 until the 1950s. In 1967, it was used as a coffee house before being torn down in 1969. It was replaced by the Thompson Observatory.

Directors 
 Professor Smith (1882-?)
 Clement Rood

Telescope 
-inch (24.1-cm) Alvan Clark & Sons refracting telescope with clock drive

See also 
 List of astronomical observatories

References 

Astronomical observatories in Wisconsin
Buildings and structures in Beloit, Wisconsin
1882 establishments in Wisconsin